18 Merriman Street, Millers Point is a heritage-listed residence located at 18 Merriman Street, in the inner city Sydney suburb of Millers Point in the City of Sydney local government area of New South Wales, Australia. It was added to the New South Wales State Heritage Register on 2 April 1999.

History 
Millers Point is one of the earliest areas of European settlement in Australia, and a focus for maritime activities. Merriman Street contains a substantial collection of Georgian style houses and terraces. This cottage was built , first tenanted by the NSW Department of Housing in 1986.

Description 
Simple single storey, two bedroom, Georgian style Victorian cottage with later verandah addition. Stone sills and brick arched lintels to door and windows. Shutters on windows, fanlight over entry door. Storeys: 1 Construction: Painted brick work, corrugated galvanised iron, timber verandah and joinery. Style: Victorian Georgian.

Externally, the condition of the property is good.

Modifications and dates 
External: New front door recently added.

Heritage listing 
As at 23 November 2000, 18 Merriman Street contains housing groups of the utmost historical importance.

It is part of the Millers Point Conservation Area, an intact residential and maritime precinct. It contains residential buildings and civic spaces dating from the 1830s and is an important example of C19th adaptation of the landscape.

18 Merriman Street, Millers Point was listed on the New South Wales State Heritage Register on 2 April 1999.

See also 

Australian residential architectural styles

References

Bibliography

Attribution

External links
 
 

New South Wales State Heritage Register sites located in Millers Point
Victorian architecture in Sydney
Houses in Millers Point, New South Wales
Articles incorporating text from the New South Wales State Heritage Register
Georgian Revival architecture in Australia
Houses completed in the 19th century
1850s establishments in Australia
Millers Point Conservation Area